The 2018 NC State Wolfpack football team represented North Carolina State University during the 2018 NCAA Division I FBS football season. The Wolfpack played their home games at Carter–Finley Stadium in Raleigh, North Carolina and competed in the Atlantic Division of the Atlantic Coast Conference. They were led by sixth-year head coach Dave Doeren. They finished the season 9–4, 5–3 in ACC play to finish in third place in the Atlantic Division. They received a bid to the Gator Bowl where they were defeated by Texas A&M.

Previous season
The Wolfpack finished the 2017 season 9–4, 6–2 in ACC play to finish in second place in the Atlantic Division. They received an invite to the Sun Bowl where they defeated Arizona State 52–31.

2018 NFL draft
The following former NC State players were selected in the 2018 NFL Draft:

Coaching staff

Roster

Roster Source:

Recruiting

Position key

Recruits

The Wolfpack signed a total of 24 recruits.

Preseason

Award watch lists
Listed in the order that they were released

ACC media poll
The ACC media poll was released on July 24, 2018.

Schedule
NC State announced its 2018 football schedule on January 17, 2018. The 2018 schedule will consist of seven home games and five away games in the regular season. The Wolfpack will host ACC foes Boston College, Florida State, Virginia, and Wake Forest and will travel to Clemson, Louisville, North Carolina, and Syracuse.

The Wolfpack will host three of the four non-conference opponents, Georgia State from the Sun Belt Conference, James Madison from Division I FCS and West Virginia from the Big 12, and will travel to Marshall from Conference USA.

Schedule Source:

Game summaries

James Madison

Georgia State

at Marshall

Virginia

Boston College

at Clemson

at Syracuse

Florida State

Wake Forest

at Louisville

at North Carolina

East Carolina

vs. Texas A&M–Gator Bowl

Awards and honors

Individual Awards

Rimington Award – Garrett Bradbury

All-ACC Teams
1st Team

Ryan Finley, Quarterback  Kelvin Harmon, Wide receiver Jakobi Meyers, Wide receiver  Tyler Jones, Offensive Tackle  Garrett Bradbury, Center  Germaine Pratt, Linebacker

2nd Team

Christopher Dunn, Kicker

3rd Team

Reggie Gallaspy Jr., Running back

All-Americans

Consensus

First Team

Garrett Bradbury, Center

Associated Press

First Team

Garrett Bradbury, Center

Third Team

Terrone Prescod, Offensive Tackle

Walter Camp

First Team

Garrett Bradbury, Center

FWAA

First Team

Garrett Bradbury, Center

Rankings

2019 NFL draft

References

NC State
NC State Wolfpack football seasons
NC State Wolfpack football